Harpalus fuscipennis is a species of ground beetle in the subfamily Harpalinae. It was described by Wiedemann in 1825.

References

fuscipennis
Beetles described in 1825